Bror Morgan Verner Åkerman (1 January 1854, Göteborg - 6 February 1903, Väversunda) was a Swedish sculptor; primarily of small figures.

Biography 

He was born to Rikard Åkerman, a ship's foreman, and his wife Hilda née Hellberg; growing up on their family farm. His childhood was difficult, however, as he had congenital kyphosis, a condition which would require the lifelong use of crutches. His tiny apartment became a popular gathering place for his fellow students, who enjoyed his singing.

In 1887, he was awarded the academy's Royal Medal for his plaster statue "Längtan" (Longing). The award was accompanied by a travel scholarship, which enabled him to go to Paris. He stayed there for almost ten years; maintaining a studio in a sort of barracks on the Avenue d’Orléans (now the ), where several other artists worked.

From 1890 to 1891, he made a combined study and pleasure trip to Florence, Rome and Naples. Not long after returning, in 1892, he married Jensina Lundquist, daughter of the decorative painter, . They were married for only three months, when she died suddenly.

Among his larger public works may be mentioned a series of reliefs at the Royal Swedish Opera, and several portrait busts; including ones of the singer , and the actress, Gerda Lundequist. After 1901, he was retained as a portrait sculptor by the Royal Academy, and was a regular participant in their exhibitions, although his final years were marred by failing health.

His long-time housekeeper, Amalia Pihlgren, was from Väversunda. After he accompanied her on a trip to visit her parents, he decided to build a home nearby. It was completed in 1902, but he had lived there for less than a year when he died, either of "heart paralysis" or pneumonia.

References

Further reading
 Svenskt konstnärslexikon, Part 5, pg.777, Allhems Förlag, Malmö. (Libris)
 Biography @ Signaturer

External links

 More works by Åkerman @ ArtNet

1854 births
1903 deaths
Swedish sculptors
People from Gothenburg
Artists with disabilities